The 1899 Delaware football team represented Delaware College—now known as the University of Delaware—as an independent during the 1899 college football season. The team posted a 6–2 record.

Herbert Rice began his third season as the team's head coach but resigned after the first game to play football for the Duquesne Country and Athletic Club of Pittsburgh. By late October, Delaware was being led by a coach Wentz from Princeton. Rice returned from Pittsburgh after Delaware had finished its season.

Schedule

References

Delaware
Delaware Fightin' Blue Hens football seasons
Delaware football